Karl F. Morrison was born November 3, 1936 in Birmingham, Alabama, United States. He is an American historian who got Bachelor's degree in 1956 from the University of Mississippi and a year later got his Master's from Cornell University. In 1961 he received his Ph.D. from the same place, and was hired as Professor Emeritus at Rutgers University in 1988. He has an award in the Humanities from the McKnight Foundation and is also a fellow at the Medieval Academy of America, John Simon Guggenheim Memorial Foundation and University of Notre Dame.

References

Living people
Cornell University alumni
University of Mississippi alumni
Date of birth missing (living people)
Fellows of the Medieval Academy of America
Year of birth missing (living people)